Zemitz is a municipality in the Vorpommern-Greifswald district, in Mecklenburg-Vorpommern, Germany. It consists of
Zemitz
Hohensee
Seckeritz
Wehrland-Bauer
Negenmark

References

Vorpommern-Greifswald